Prljavo kazalište (Dirty Theater) is a rock band from Zagreb, Croatia. Since its formation in 1977, the group changed several music styles and line ups but remained one of the top acts of both the Croatian and Yugoslav rock scenes.

Biography

Davorin Bogović fronting and departure (1977–1980)
Prljavo kazalište was formed in 1977 in Dubrava, part of Zagreb, the capital of the then SR Croatia. Founding members included: Jasenko Houra (rhythm guitar), Zoran Cvetković a.k.a. Zok (lead guitar), Nino Hrastek (bass guitar) and Tihomir Fileš (drums). Its first vocalist became Davorin Bogović, although they were thinking about taking Davor Gobac (later of Psihomodo pop) instead. All of them, except Houra, previously played in another band called Ciferšlus (Zipper), but after he joined them to form a new group, they opted for the name Prljavo kazalište (meaning 'Dirty Theatre' in Croatian) after an episode of the satirical Italian comic book Alan Ford, which was very popular in the former Yugoslavia.

In its early beginnings, Prljavo kazalište was a punk rock band, although they initially wanted to sound like The Rolling Stones for whom they maintained a great admiration. The group performed live for the first time in 1978 at a gig organized by the magazine Polet where they were noted for their furious punk image and stage performance. In the same year, Prljavo kazalište released its first single, the punk rock sounding Televizori for the major record label Jugoton. It featured three songs: Televizori, Majka and Moje djetinjstvo. In 1979, Suzy Records released their second single Moj je otac bio u ratu. That song was included in the compilation album Novi Punk Val compiled by Igor Vidmar, along with Pankrti, Paraf and other prominent artists of the former Yugoslav punk rock scene .

In 1979, they released their first eponymous album, produced by Piko Stančić, for Suzy Records.  It was promoted when the group performed as a support act of the Yugoslav band Bijelo dugme at a concert held at the JNA Stadium. During the recording sessions, Zoran Cvetković left the band and was replaced by Marijan Brkić. The album soon came to prominence all over the former Yugoslav federation for its social commentary and provoked the then-ruling one-party system, additionally because it also featured probably the first gay-themed song in Yugoslavia titled "Neki dječaci (Some Boys)" (followed later by "Retko te viđam sa devojkama" by Idoli). The authorities valuated the album as "šund" ("kitsch") and hence they imposed higher taxes on its sale price, while the records considered "truly artistic" enjoyed a reduced tax rate. Despite that, the group was not banned and it could freely continue to work and sell records, because non-aligned Yugoslavia was not so strict regarding censorship as the other communist states. Although the band played on the album in a rudimentary manner, the media and the public proclaimed it one of the best debut albums ever released in Yugoslavia. The record sleeve was designed by Mirko Ilić and featured a parody of the famous John Pasche's Tongue and Lips design with an added safety pin, representing the band's equal respect for both punk rock scene and old rock bands like The Rolling Stones.

On their second album titled Crno bijeli svijet (Black and White World) released in 1980, Prljavo kazalište affiliated with the new wave music, accepting a more polished image and sound. The album, again produced by Piko Stančić and released for Suzy, was recorded in Milan, Italy. The album included several Ska and Two Tone songs such as the main single Crno bijeli svijet and Mi plešemo, meaning We Dance, although the original title was supposed to be Mi pijemo (We Drink). Also, it featured a cover version of Sedamnaest ti je godina tek by the notable retro traditional pop singer Ivo Robić. The record was a major success and Prljavo kazalište became one of the leading acts of the former Yugoslav new wave scene (called "Novi val" in Croatian).

Jasenko Houra fronting, Bogović's return (1981–1983)
Soon afterwards, Davorin Bogović left the group. Reasons included disagreements with the other band members or his inability to withstand the pressure of extensive touring and recording, as the band was already in the top of the Yugoslav rock scene and had tight schedules.

In 1981, the group recorded its third album in the studio of Sjunne Ferger in Sweden. The album was produced by Tini Varga, featuring guest appearances by the percussionists Ferger and Miroslav Budanko and the saxophonist Janne Gustafsson. Since Bogović's departure, this time Jasenko Houra had to take over the position of a main vocalist. With this album, Prljavo kazalište gradually moved on to a more conventional rock, hence achieving great mainstream success across whole Yugoslavia. The album featured a tribute to Bruce Springsteen (the songs Heroj ulice and Široke ulice) and to Phil Collins in the ballad Noćas sam izašao na kišu. After the release of the record, Fileš and Hrastek were conscripted in the Yugoslav People's Army, so the group performed with the help of the drummer Dražen Šolc and the former member Zoran Cvetković who played bass this time. The latter released a solo album from which one song was included in the Vrući dani i vrele noći compilation and he later joined the group Dorian Gray in 1982.

In 1983, Davorin Bogović returned to the band, and sang on their fourth album Korak od sna released jointly by Suzy and CBS Records, which featured the hit Sve je lako kad si mlad. That was Prljavo kazalište's last record with Bogović and after he left he was replaced as a frontman by Mladen Bodalec, the album's back vocalist, a former member of Patrola. Between others, on this album is song "Dobar vjetar u ledja" ("Good wind in the back"), which is some sort of homage to legendary Hollywood actor Montgomery Clift.

Mladen Bodalec fronted Prljavo Kazalište (1984–present)
With Bodalec, the group released its fifth album Zlatne godine in the beginning of 1986. This record was shifted to pop-rock oriented music and it included the successful hits: Ne zovi mama doktora, Sladoled and Ma kog me boga za tebe pitaju. Unlike their previous Suzy Records albums, this one was signed for Jugoton. 

In 1988, Prljavo kazalište released their sixth album Zaustavite Zemlju which included several hits such as Zaustavite zemlju, Marina, Moj bijeli labude and Slaži mi. The album, which was released for Suzy, included the song Mojoj majci which Houra tributed to his recently deceased mother. At that time, shortly before the upcoming breakup of Yugoslavia, tensions broke out between the constituent countries of the Yugoslav federation, so the issue of an eventual Croatian independence from Yugoslavia started to rise. Hence the lyrics Zadnja ruža Hrvatska (meaning: Last Croatian Rose) made the song very popular in Croatia, but also criticized in some parts of the rest of Yugoslavia due to (perceived) nationalist undertones, which were considered politically incorrect for the Yugoslav policy of brotherhood and unity. After the album's release, Marijan Brkić left to join Parni valjak and was replaced with Damir Lipošek. The band went on an international tour which culminated with a big open-air show played on October 17, 1989 on the Republic Square in Zagreb in front of approximately 200,000–300,000 people.

In the following year, the group released its double live album titled after the song Sve je lako kad si mlad – LIVE!. Beside live material from the concert held in November 1988 at the Zagreb's Dom Sportova and from the performance at the ZG Rock Forces festival, it included few older studio tracks as well. The record sleeve again featured the band's logo as on the first album but on a black background. During the same year, Prljavo kazalište recorded a new studio album titled Devedeseta (meaning: Ninetieth, as in 1990), produced by Mate Došen, while the backing vocals were recorded by Davorin Bogović and Vesna Došen. The group also got a new member, the keyboards player Mladen Roško.

In the beginning of the 1990s, Prljavo kazalište frequently played shows abroad for the Croatian diaspora. During the first years of the Croatian War of Independence, which established the Republic of Croatia as an independent state, the group paused its activities and in 1993 with the new keyboard player Fedor Boić (former member of ITD bend) released the album Lupi petama for InterService label with the patriotic war songs Lupi petama, Pet dana ratujem, subotom se zaljubljujem and others. The group adopted elements of folk music and a traditional tambura orchestra from Vinkovci appeared on their track Uzalud vam trud svirači. The record cover featured a plate filled with bullets.

In 1994 Prljavo kazalište received the Croatian Porin music award for this album, but also in other categories as well. In 1995 the group released a new live album recorded at the open-air concert held on Christmas Eve at Dolac Market titled Božićni koncert (Christmas Concert). In the end of 1996 the album S vremena na vrijeme with a luxurious cover came out for Croatia Records, however it didn't bring any fresh ideas. The recorded material was mixed and pre-mastered in London, UK with the help of Zoran Cvetković. The album included a guest appearance by Mel Gaynor, the drummer of Simple Minds.

Jasenko Houra formed a record label called CBS a pun to CBS Records for whom the group once released an album, and the abbreviation for the band's best known song Crno Bijeli Svijet. In the late 1997 Prljavo kazalište celebrated 20th anniversary by playing a concert with a symphony orchestra at the Vatroslav Lisinski Concert Hall and released the recordings as a live album titled XX Godina on Houra's new label. In 1998 the group released its album Dani ponosa i slave, which was the first studio album released after the 20th anniversary. It included guest appearance by the Croatian rap music group Tram 11.

In the 2000s (decade), Prljavo kazalište released a four audio CD box set titled Sve je lako kad si mlad (not to be confused with the previously mentioned live album with the same title). Its record sleeve again featured the band's logo, but this time on a white background as it was on the first album. 
In the end of 2002, Prljavo kazalište signed a contract with Dallas Records which released their album Radio Dubrava in the following year. In 2003, the band took part in the rockumentary Sretno dijete which covers the former Yugoslav new wave scene and features many eminent former Yugoslav rock acts from Zagreb, Belgrade and Ljubljana.

In 2005, the band released the album Moj dom je Hrvatska.

In 2008, the band released the double album Tajno ime which was recorded at Metalworks Studios in Mississauga, Ontario. The following year a compilation of live recordings Best of Live and a DVD live album XXX godina live, celebrating their 30th anniversary.

In 2012, the band released the album Možda dogodine featuring the guest appearance by Davorin Bogović.

In 2014, Prljavo Kazalište released the single Tamni slapovi.

Awards and tributes
The book YU 100: najbolji albumi jugoslovenske rok i pop muzike (YU 100: The Best albums of Yugoslav pop and rock music) ranked the album Crno bijeli svijet as the 36th best album released in former Yugoslavia. The songs from the album, "Mi plešemo" appeared on the 47th and "Crno bijeli svijet" on the 60th place on the 100 best former Yugoslav rock songs selected by the listeners of the Serbian Radio B92.
 
The band was awarded with the Porins for the best album of the year 1994 and best rock albums in 1998 and 1999.

A Polish cover version of the Prljavo kazalište's song Crno bijeli svijet, translated as Czarno-Biały Świat performed by Kazik was included in the tribute album titled Yugoton released in Poland in 2001. The record is a tribute to the former Yugoslav rock scene.

Discography

Studio albums
 Prljavo kazalište (1979)
 Crno bijeli svijet (1980)
 Heroj ulice (1981)
 Korak od sna (1983)
 Zlatne godine (1985)
 Zaustavite Zemlju (1988)
 Devedeseta (1990)
 Lupi petama... (1993)
 S vremena na vrijeme (1996)
 Dani ponosa i slave (1998)
 Radio Dubrava (2003)
 Moj dom je Hrvatska (2005)
 Tajno ime (2008)
 Možda dogodine (2012)
 Babylon Berlin (2022)

Live albums
 Sve je lako kad si mlad – live (1989)
 Zabranjeni koncert (1994)
 Božićni koncert (1995)
 XX godina (1997)
 Best of Live (2008)
 XXX godina - Live (2009)
 XL World Tour Finale (2019)
 30 godina od koncerta na Trgu - Arena Zagreb (2020)

Compilation albums
 Najveći hitovi (1994)
 Sve je lako kad si mlad '77 – '99 (box set; 2001)
 Rock balade (2004)

Video albums
 Prljavo kazalište na Trgu (2003)

Singles
 "Televizori" (1978)
 'Moj je otac bio u ratu" (1979)
 "Moderna djevojka" (1980)
 "Moja djevojka je otišla u armiju" (1986)
 "...Mojoj majci" (1989)
 "Dođi sada Gospode" (1996)
 "Možda dogodine" (2010)
 "Tamni slapovi" (2014)

Other appearances
 Novi punk val (1978)
 ZG Rock Forces (1997)
 Sretno dijete – originalna glazba iz filma (2004)

See also
Croatian popular music
SFR Yugoslav pop and rock scene
New wave music in Yugoslavia
Sretno dijete

References

Janjatović, Petar. Ilustrovana Enciklopedija Yu Rocka 1960–1997, publisher: Geopoetika, 1997 
Sretno dijete, documentary film
Bio at Hit Records Official site 

Croatian rock music groups
Yugoslav rock music groups
Croatian new wave musical groups
Musical groups established in 1977
Musicians from Zagreb